The Coach of the England cricket was a position first filled in 1986.  There have been nine coaches in total, with Peter Moores holding the position twice. The role usually entails selecting players for squads, selecting the starting eleven and giving media interviews. Commonly referred to as coach, the role has in the past also been labelled as team manager or team director.

List of England Coaches

The following men have held the position of Head Coach of the England Cricket Team. Duncan Fletcher is the longest serving coach, having held the role for eight years, and Peter Moores is the only man to have held the position twice. 

The current coach of the test team is Brendon McCullum. Matthew Mott is the current white-ball coach.

Splitting the role

In 2012 Andy Flower resigned from his position of coach of the ODI and T20 teams, but remained in his role as coach of the Test team. Ashley Giles was appointed coach of the limited overs team but had no involvement in the Test team. Flower was the first of the two coaches to depart, with Ashley Giles being replaced as limited overs coach when Peter Moores was appointed as the roles were combined again.

Foreign Coaches

Duncan Fletcher became the first foreign coach of the English cricket team(1999-2007), whilst his fellow Zimbabwean; Andy Flower was head coach from 2009-2014. 2019 World Cup winning coach of the England team, Trevor Bayliss, is Australian. The current coaches, Brendon McCullum and Matthew Mott are from New Zealand and Australia respectively.

References

English cricket lists
Coaches of the England cricket team